Shirley Lavina Louise Weinberg (née Ogle; 9 May 1926 – 20 April 2021) was an Australian former athlete who competed in the 100 yards and 220 yards and other sprint distances. She held numerous state and national women's sprint records, and at the 1947 Victorian Athletics Championships won all four sprint events, 75 yards through to 440 yards.

Early life 

Ogle was born in the Melbourne suburb of Fawkner in Victoria. Her parents were William "Billy" Ogle, a professional bike rider and process engraver, and "Peggy" Martin, a stage performer.

She attended scholastically elite University High School where her athletic prowess stood out, her small stature and slight build notwithstanding. She joined Southport Athletic Club and competed in a wide range of events, including the discus, in which she won one of many club junior championships.

Athletic career
Unfortunately for her, Shirley's athletic career happened to coincide with the period when Australian women sprinters were at their most dominant.

Not having much big race experience at all, she didn't perform up to her best at the Women's 1948 Olympic Selection Athletics Trials in Sydney and didn't make the team for London . She was 5th in the 100 yards, with the first four, Joyce King, Shirley Strickland, Betty McKinnon and June Matson making up the Women's 4 x 100 metre relay  which won the Silver medal. She was 5th in the 220 yards too, behind Joyce King, future multiple Olympic Champion and World Recordholder, Shirley Strickland, Betty McKinnon and, another future multiple Olympic Champion and World Recordholder, Marjorie Jackson. Competition for a spot on the sprint team was obviously pretty tough, with Joyce King and Shirley Strickland being the 1st. and 2nd. ranked of all the athletes from all the sports that had been presented by their sports associations to the Australian Olympic Federation (AOF) for grading and selection in the Australian 1948 Summer Olympics team.

The strength of Australia's women in athletics at the time was further demonstrated by their results in the 1950 Commonwealth Games in Auckland where they won every event, except the High Jump and Long Jump.

Additional information
In 1950, she married Australian Olympian Hurdler Ray Weinberg and supported his efforts in making the 1952 Summer Olympics team and was integral in the success of his other ventures in athletics. She'd also assisted him with his 1948 London Olympics programme where, even though visiting Olympic teams had to provide their own food due to post-war privations, she supplemented that with food packages, including eggs in the form of a special homemade Advocaat.

Shirley and Ray have three children.

Statistics

Records
{| class="wikitable"
|-
! Event
! Record
! Place
! Date
|-
| 100y ||  Australian  ||   Wangaratta, Australia || 7 January 1948
|-
| 220y || South Australian  ||  Adelaide, Australia || 1947
|-
| 100y || Victorian   ||  Melbourne, Australia || 1948
|-
| 220y || Victorian  || Melbourne, Australia || 1948
|}

State Championships
{| class="wikitable"
|-
! Year
! State
! Event
! Place
! Time
|-
| 1945 || Victoria  || 220y  ||  1st. || 26.4
|-
| 1946 ||  Victoria  || 220y  ||  1st. || 
|-
|  ||  ||440y   ||  1st. || 61.3
|-|
|  ||   ||4 x 100y Relay  || 1st. || 
|-
| 1947 ||  Victoria  ||75y  || 1st. || 
|-
|  ||    ||100y  || 1st. || 11.0w 
|-
|  ||    ||220y  || 1st. || 25.9
|-
|  ||   ||440y  || 1st. || 
|-
|  ||  South Australia  ||220y  || 1st. || 25.8
|}

See also
 Ray Weinberg

References

1926 births
2021 deaths
Australian female sprinters
Sportswomen from Victoria (Australia)
People educated at University High School, Melbourne
People from the City of Merri-bek
Athletes from Melbourne